Mary Stewart Kilgour (24 September 1851 – 1955) was a suffragist, educationalist, writer and campaigner for women's rights.

Family
Kilgour was one of 13 children born to a Scottish physician, Dr John Stewart Kilgour (1815 – 1902), and Susan Anne (née Archer). Kilgour was born in Longford, Van Dieman’s Land (now Tasmania) in 1851. Her family returned to Britain in 1854, living in Worcester, London, Exmouth and the Isle of Man before settling in Cheltenham in around 1860.

Work
In 1882, Kilgour collaborated with Annie Leigh Browne, Browne's sister Mary (later Lady Lockyer) and Henrietta Müller to found College Hall, London.

She was also involved with the Browne sisters in the running of the Women's Local Government Society, succeeding Annie as honorary treasurer from 1892 to 1900, after which Mary Browne (who married scientist Sir Norman Lockyer in 1903) retained the post until 1918. Active in Liberal Party circles, she helped found the Union of Practical Suffragists, co-authoring one of its pamphlets (c. 1899).

Writing
Women as Members of Local Sanitary Authorities (pamphlet published by the Women's Local Government Society, 1896)
Women and the London Government Bill (published by the Women's Local Government Society, 1899)
The London Government Act: The latest disqualification of women (1899)
Position of women in secondary education (1899)
The James Stansfeld Memorial Trust. Its Origin and Work (published by Women's Printing Society, 1934)

References

British suffragists
1851 births
People from Tasmania
1955 deaths